The Collins Kids were a group of young chess players invited by John W. Collins to play chess against teams from other countries. The international link began at the 1972 World Chess Championship in Reykjavík, Iceland between Bobby Fischer (USA) and Boris Spassky (USSR). The first international competition was held in Reykjavik over New Year's Day 1978.  The second competition with the Icelandic kids was held in New York over New Year's Day 1979. Grandmaster Maxim Dlugy was a member of the Collins' team during the second event.  The third competition was held in Iceland August 8th-13th 1980. John Collins was a lifelong mentor and friend of Fischer. The Collins Kids would often field teams of young players at the United States Annual Team Championship in Parsippany, NJ. 

Howard Kipp Parker has served as a director of the Collins Kids since 1986.

Collins Kids
Collins Kids
Chess in the United States